Chiben Gakuen (智辯学園) is a private academic institution with campuses in Nara Prefecture and Wakayama Prefecture, Japan.  The school sends many students to the best universities and colleges in Japan, including the University of Tokyo, Kyoto University and other public and private schools.

The school is well known in Japan for its baseball team, which usually participates in and frequently wins the Koshien Tournament for high school baseball.

Student exchange programs
Chiben Gakuen Wakayama participates in student exchange programs with:
St Leonard's College in Melbourne, Victoria (Australia), and
Thomas Jefferson High School for Science and Technology in Alexandria, Virginia.

Chiben Gakuen Nara participates in a student exchange program with：
Exeter High School in Exeter, New Hampshire, and
Troy High School in Troy, Michigan.

The school celebrated the 20th anniversary of its exchange program with St Leonards College in November 2007, and with Thomas Jefferson in 2013.

Notable alumni of Chiben Gakuen Junior & Senior High School

Baseball players
Nobuhiro Takashiro
Masahiro Tanaka
Takahiro Shoda
Masato Nakamura
Taichi Okazaki
Ryuichi Kajimae
Shintaro Masuda
Kazuma Okamoto
Taishi Hirooka
Ryuya Matsumoto

Others
Daniel Kahl, (exchange student), gaijin tarento

Notable alumni of Chiben Gakuen Wakayama

Baseball players
Jin Nakatani
Shinichi Takeuchi
Toshiya Okada
Haruki Nishikawa
Fumiya Kurokawa

Others
Tatsuya Tanimoto, politician

See also
List of schools in Japan
Chiben Gakuen Wakayama (Japanese Wikipedia)

External links
 Chiben Gakuen
 Chiben Gakuen Wakayama homepage
English site:
 https://web.archive.org/web/20050526195823/http://www.chiben.ac.jp/wakayama/index_e.htm
 Chiben Gakuen Nara college

Private schools in Japan